Acer erianthum is an Asian species of maple. It has been found only in China (Gansu, Guangxi, Hubei, Shaanxi, Sichuan, Yunnan).

Acer erianthum is a tree up to 15 meters tall with greenish-gray bark. Leaves are non-compound, thin and papery, usually with 5 long tapering lobes but occasionally 7.

References

External links
line drawing for Flora of China figures 4–6 at top

erianthum
Plants described in 1901
Flora of China